"I'm Gonna Scream+" is Tomoko Kawase's fourth single released as Tommy heavenly6. The single was released on June 7, 2006 by DefSTAR Records, and peaked at #22 on the Oricon singles chart. "I'm Gonna Scream+" was the first single for Tommy heavenly6's second studio album: Heavy Starry Heavenly.

Track listing

Music video

A music video for I'm Gonna Scream+ was released featuring Tommy in a haunted Candyland world, wielding a scythe, fighting off ghosts, a knight, and an army of Tarako Kewpie dolls. A second Tommy is seen in the clouds aiding the first Tommy on her journey.

References

External links 
 Tommy heavenly6 Official Site

2006 singles
Tomoko Kawase songs
Songs written by Tomoko Kawase